Prince Matriculation Higher Secondary School (PMHSS) is a private institution located in the southern suburbs of Chennai, Tamil Nadu, India. The school is recognized by the state government of Tamil Nadu and is affiliated with the matriculation system of Tamil Nadu up to Standard 10 and the Tamil Nadu State Board for Standards 11 and 12.

Founded in 1978 by Dr. K. Vasudevan, (the current principal and correspondent) PMHSS is well known for consistently achieving state ranks in Standard 10 and 12 public examinations.

About 3,000 students attend the school, with about 350 students in each year from grades 9-12.

Branches
PMHSS was originally started in Madipakkam on 12 June 1978, and subsequently a branch was opened in Nanganallur, both of which are well-known suburbs in southern Chennai. The school at Madipakkam is the Head Office. The school building consists of an Annex, the higher secondary block, the lower primary block, and another large plot used as the playground as well as the school's parking lot.

References 

Primary schools in Tamil Nadu
High schools and secondary schools in Chennai
Educational institutions established in 1978
1978 establishments in Tamil Nadu